Abdiel ( "Servant of El") is a biblical name which has been used as the name for a number of several notable people. The name has the same meaning as Obadiah and is cognate with the Arabic name Abdullah. Abdiel is mentioned a single time in the Bible, in 1 Chronicles 5:15: "Ahi the son of Abdiel, the son of Guni, chief of the house of their fathers."

People
Notable people with the name include:

 Abdiel Arroyo (born 1993), Panamanian footballer
 Abdiel Ayarza (born 1992), Panamanian footballer
 Abdiel Colberg (born 1957), Puerto Rican film director and television producer
 Abdiel Crossman (1804–1859), mayor of New Orleans, Louisiana, from 1846–1854
 Abdiel Vázquez (born 1984), Mexican pianist
 Abdiel Villa (born 1983), Mexican footballer
 Aperel (fl. c. 1350s BCE), ancient Egyptian courtier and administrator

Fictional characters

Paradise Lost
Chief among fictional characters bearing the name Abdiel is the seraph Abdiel appearing in Milton's Paradise Lost (1667), specifically in Book V and Book VI.  Two passages from Book V serve to establish Abdiel's character:

Abdiel denounces Satan after hearing him incite revolt among the angels, and abandons Lucifer to bring the news of his defection to God. However, when he arrives, he finds that preparations are already underway for battle. In the ensuing fight, Abdiel smites Satan, Ariel, Ramiel, and Arioch, presumably among others.  In Asimov's Annotated Paradise Lost, Isaac Asimov theorized that Abdiel was in fact a representation of Milton himself.  Likewise, in Cyder, Ambrose Philips refers to Milton as "that other bard" and contrasts Milton to his character Abdiel.

In the film Paradise Lost, which was to be released in 2012, Abdiel was set to be played by Djimon Hounsou. However, pre-production of the project was ceased not long after, citing budgetary concerns of the production company.

Other uses
The character name Abdiel has also been used:
 by Madeleine L'Engle in Many Waters as one among the seraphim
 by Margaret Weis in the Star of the Guardians trilogy as a villain
 by Anatole France in The Revolt of the Angels as the "angelic name" of the character Arcade, the guardian angel bent on causing the revolt that gives the novel its title
 by Steven Brust in To Reign in Hell as the ambitious angel who catalyzes the dispute between Yaweh and Satan which would eventually result in the revolt in Heaven
 by Kage Baker in The Graveyard Game as an immortal who maintains certain secret machinery
 As a major character in Shin Megami Tensei V, as an archangel who is the main representative of the game's law route

References

Hebrew-language names
Individual angels
Theophoric names